Chunganenol is a resveratrol hexamer found in Vitis chunganensis.

References 

Resveratrol oligomers
Heterocyclic compounds with 3 rings
Heterocyclic compounds with 5 rings